Sergey Ivanovich Markin (1903—1942) — Moscow professional artist, painter and artist-decorator of the TRAM Theater (modern Lenkom). Master of urban landscape and narrative compositions conveying the spirit of the pre-war era. He was a member of the Pleiades of Artists of the 1920s-1930s. He worked in the Moscow Union of Artists (MOSSH). He died in battles near Moscow in the first year of the Great Patriotic War.

Sergey Markin, according to the historian of art and art critic Olga Roitenberg, is known for “peacefully-focused” landscapes. Critics noted the originality of his compositional thinking and a heightened sense of time. He is the author of paintings on the themes of the history of revolution and civil war, genre paintings, portraits, landscapes. He took part in the design of Moscow for the revolutionary holidays.

Biography 
Born in Moscow on August 18, 1903.

Sergey Markin began artistic education in Sunday classes of the Imperial Stroganov Central Art and Industrial College (1911-1916). 
 In 1916-1920 studied at the Stroganov Central Art and Industry School, the First State Free Art Studio.
 In 1920-1927 studied in Vkhutemas/Vkhutein in Moscow.

Sergey Markin entered the pleiad of young artists of lyrical and romantic orientation, who began at the turn of the 1920-1930s, and "forgotten" for half a century for ideological reasons. In 1929, the Great Turning occurred in the fine arts of the USSR — the last exhibitions of all registered societies took place. After this, a “cultural revolution” began, where the censors sifted hostile petty-bourgeois artistic movements. These artists were united by moral maximalism, so the beginning of their creative biographies turned out to be a stellar moment.

The colors and harmony of his paintings were highly appreciated by art critic C. B. Nikritin, who noted: “Markin is the hope of our art. He has an artistic sense of beauty. Speaks the language of colors and shapes. The works about revolution are compositionally complex, but the selection is accurate. ... Markin has his eyes on the complex amount of rhythm combinations. It is a variety of genres. Plot thinks poetically. Own eye on the rhythm of the modern city "

Sergey Ivanovich Markin was seriously wounded and died from his wounds in February 1942 in the field hospital No. 111 near the village of Sereda. He was buried in a mass grave near the village of Sereda (Moscow region).

Exhibitions 
Sergey Markin painting in main Russian art exhibitions:
 1934 Moscow: The personal exhibition of oil painting by S. I. Markin. House of Soviet Writers. 43 works submitted.
 1934 Moscow: "The Exhibition of Young Artists Beginning in Moscow".
 1935 Moscow: Reporting exhibition in the MOOSKH "Donbass in Painting".
 1936 Moscow: Exhibition "Moscow in Painting and Graphics".
 1937 Moscow: "The first exhibition of watercolor painting by Moscow artists".
 1939 Moscow: "All-Union Exhibition of Young Artists, dedicated to the 20th anniversary of the Komsomol".
 1940 Russia: "Mobile exhibition of works by Moscow and Leningrad artists in the cities of the Volga region".
 1940 Moscow: "The Seventh Exhibition of the Union of Moscow Artists".
 1965 Moscow. Exhibition of artists of those killed in the war.
 1975 Moscow. Exhibition for the 30th anniversary of the victory.
 1977 Moscow: “Artists of the First Five-Year Plan” (“One-Day Exhibition” in Moscow House of Artists, October 31).
 1980 Moscow: The State Tretyakov Gallery: “Moscow in Russian and Soviet painting”, entered the exhibition catalog.
 1985 Moscow: Exhibition for the 40th anniversary of the II World War victory.
 1990 Moscow: The State Tretyakov Gallery: “Thirties”.
 1992 Moscow: Moscow artists of the 1920-1930s.
 2017 Moscow: The State Tretyakov Gallery Moscow through the ages.
 2021 Moscow: Galeyev Gallery (Behind the façade of the Soviet era: stories of Moscow artists of the 1920s-1940s).

Works gallery

References

Literature 
List of publications about S. Markin (mostly in Russian):
 1927: Иванова-Веэн Л. И. Маркин С. И.: 1927 Живфак // ВХУТЕМАС — ВХУТЕИН: Москва — Ленинград: Выпускники 1920—1930: Справочник. М.: АртКомМедиа, 2010. С. 14. (всего 48 с. Тираж 500 экз.)
 1932: Выставка художников-одиночек // Пролетарское искусство. 1932. № 7/8. С. 29.
 1933: Художники РСФСР за 15 лет: (1917—1932) Каталог юбилейной выставки живописи, графики, и скульптуры. Л.: , 1933.
 1934: Художник, живописец, декоратор и гравёр по дереву Сергей Иванович Маркин: выставка в клубе им. М. Горького / Всероссийский кооперативный Союз работников изобразительных искусств; отв. ред. Ю. М. Славинский. Москва: Всехудожник, 1934. 5, [1] с.; 15 см. (РГБ. Искусство. Хранение: 90/8.695)
 1980: Ройтенберг О. О. Москва в творчестве художника // Искусство. 1980. № 8.
 1981: Московские художники в дни Великой Отечественной войны: Воспоминания. Письма. Статьи. / Ред. П. К. Суздалев, Сост. В. А. Юматов. М.: Советский художник, 1981. 511 с.
 1985: Ройтенберг О. О. Они погибли на войне // Искусство. 1985. № 4.
 1991: Московские художники 20-30-е годы. Каталог. М.: МОСХ, ЦДХ, 1991.
 2008: Ройтенберг О. О. Неужели кто-то вспомнил, что мы были… : Из истории художественной жизни. 1925—1935. М.: Галарт, 2008. 559 с.
 2022: Диденко Ю. В. Маркин Сергей Иванович: (Каталожные № 133—138) // Каталог собрания Живопись первой половины XX века. Т. 6. Кн. 3. (буквы М-П). Москва: Август Борг, 2022. С. 69-71. (Каталог собрания Государственной Третьяковской галереи; Серия Живопись VIII—XX веков).

Links 

 Sergei Markin — Russian art in 20th century (in Russian: русское искусство: XX век).
 Sergey Markin — facebook page.

1903 births
1942 deaths
20th-century Russian painters
Russian male painters
Modern painters
Russian avant-garde
Soviet painters
Soviet military personnel killed in World War II
20th-century Russian male artists
Stroganov Moscow State Academy of Arts and Industry alumni